A subpoena (also subpœna, supenna or subpena) or witness summons is a writ issued by a government agency, most often a court, to compel testimony by a witness or production of evidence under a penalty for failure. There are two common types of subpoenas:
 subpoena ad testificandum orders a person to testify before the ordering authority or face punishment. The subpoena can also request the testimony to be given by phone or in person.
 subpoena duces tecum orders a person or organization to bring physical evidence before the ordering authority or face punishment. This is often used for requests to mail copies of documents to requesting party or directly to court.

Etymology

The term subpoena is from the Middle English suppena and the Latin phrase sub poena meaning "under penalty". It is also spelled "subpena". The subpoena has its source in English common law and it is now used almost with universal application throughout the English common law world. John Waltham, Bishop of Salisbury, is said to have created the writ of subpoena during the reign of Richard II. However, for civil proceedings in England and Wales, it is now described as a witness summons, as part of reforms to replace Latin terms with Plain English understandable to the layman.

Process

Australia 
In New South Wales, a court may set aside the whole, or part, of a subpoena on the basis that it is a "fishing expedition". In Lowery v Insurance Australia Ltd, the NSW Court of Appeal held that where documents requested in the schedule of a subpoena are deemed to have no relevance to the proceedings in dispute, the subpoena may be set aside as it has no legitimate forensic purpose. It was also held that it was not the role of the Court to redraft the subpoena and narrow its scope to those issues in dispute. In Victoria a subpoena is usually issued by a court registry officer, and does not require leave of the court.

New Zealand
In New Zealand, subpoenas are governed under the rules of the court in which the subpoena is issued.

United States 
Subpoenas are usually issued by the clerk of the court in the name of the judge presiding over the case. Additionally, court rules may permit lawyers to issue subpoenas themselves in their capacity as officers of the court. Typically subpoenas are issued "in blank" and it is the responsibility of the lawyer representing the party  (plaintiff or defendant) on whose behalf the testimony is to be given to serve the subpoena on the witness. If a witness is reluctant to testify, then the personal service of subpoena is usually required with proof of service by non-party server.

The subpoena will usually be on the letterhead of the court where the case is filed, name the parties to the case, and be addressed by name to the person whose testimony is being sought. It will contain the language "You are hereby commanded to report in person to the clerk of this court" or similar, describing the specific location, scheduled date and time of the appearance. Some issuing jurisdictions include an admonishment advising the subject of the criminal penalty for failure to comply with a subpoena, and reminding him or her not to leave the court facilities until excused by a competent authority, often ending with the archaic threat "Fail not at your peril." In some situations, the person having to testify or produce documents is paid.

Pro se litigants who represent themselves, unlike lawyers, must ask a court clerk to officially issue them subpoena forms when they need to call witnesses by phone or in person, or when they need to officially request documents to be sent to them or directly to court. Any documents that have not been subpoenaed to court or verified by a witness may be dismissed by the opposite party as hearsay, unless excepted by hearsay rules or permitted by the judge. If the witness is called via long-distance phone call, then the requesting party is responsible for initiating the call and providing a payment with a prepaid phone card. Most states (including California) have further restrictions on subpoena use in criminal cases.

Some states (as is the case in Florida) require the subpoenaing party to first file a Notice of Intent to Serve Subpoena, or a Notice of Production from Non-Party ten days prior to issuing the subpoena, so that the other party may have ample time to file any objections.

Also, the party being subpoenaed has the right to object to the issuance of the subpoena, if it is for an improper purpose, such as subpoenaing records that have no relevance to the proceedings, or subpoenaing persons who would have no evidence to present, or subpoenaing records or testimony that is confidential or privileged.

Standing committees in both houses of the United States Congress have the authority to send out subpoenas for legitimate lawmaking and investigation purposes. This compels the production of testimony or records, and failure to respond constitutes contempt of Congress.

There are several exceptions to being required to testify in court, including the following examples:

 Fifth Amendment – Under the Fifth Amendment to the United States Constitution, no person shall be compelled to be a witness against themselves. Witnesses can't be forced to testify if the testimony may incriminate them. This right can, however, be set aside if the witness is granted immunity. This immunity allows them to testify, and makes them immune to prosecution for any crimes they confess to.
 Spousal privilege – In most cases, a person cannot be compelled to testify against their spouse. This rule also exists as a consequence of the Fifth Amendment and the "One flesh" concept of Marriage. Under this rule, since married spouses are joined together as one entity, they cannot be forced to testify against each other. Exceptions to this rule include domestic violence or sexual abuse cases.
 Counselors or Priests – Communication with a counselor or priest is considered privileged, because both jobs require that clients be free to express themselves completely honestly, without fear of consequences.
 Lawyers – In order to provide competent legal advice, clients must be free to express all details to their lawyer. Communication with a lawyer is protected, and a lawyer can't be forced to testify against a client.
 Doctors – Medical professionals are forbidden from disclosing a patient's private medical information without the patient's permission, under the law of patient confidentiality. A doctor cannot provide testimony based upon the patient's private medical information, and a doctor cannot be compelled to disclose medical records.
 Diplomats – Foreign diplomats can never be forced to testify in court, under Diplomatic Immunity.
 Incompetent Witness or Evidence - A witness may have memory or other cognitive deficits, which could affect their ability to truthfully recall events. They also may not be physically fit to appear in court.
 Inadmissible Evidence – If the evidence is obtained illegally, it is not admissible in court. For example, someone who sneaks onto private property and overhears a private conversation between two people cannot testify to that conversation in court. The same applies to illegally recorded conversations, illegally taken photos, or other eavesdropped conversations. If a burglar broke into a home and found illicit drugs inside, their testimony to that discovery would not be allowed in court, as it was illegally obtained.

"Friendly subpoena" 
A "friendly subpoena" is a subpoena that is issued to an individual or entity who might otherwise testify or submit evidence willingly without a subpoena, but is prevented from doing so due to a higher order legal, ethical or regulatory loyalty or fiduciary responsibility, which can only be superseded by a subpoena. It is called a "friendly" subpoena because the recipient would otherwise be or is very likely to be willing to cooperate with the investigation at issue, once issued a subpoena.

See also
 Administrative subpoena
 Indictment
 Summons

References

Further reading
 "The Press and Subpoenas: An Overview", by Marlena Telvick and Amy Rubin, Frontline, PBS, February 20, 2010.

Writs
Legal documents
Legal documents with Latin names